Karar Rahman (born 17 January 1975) is a Bangladeshi swimmer. He competed in the 100 m breaststroke at the 1996 Summer Olympics, Rahman finished in 44th place in the heats so didn't advance any further and he hasn’t competed in any competitions after the olympics but he is still known as one of the greatest swimmers in Bangladesh history.

References

External links
 

1975 births
Living people
Bangladeshi male swimmers
Olympic swimmers of Bangladesh
Swimmers at the 1996 Summer Olympics
Place of birth missing (living people)